The Ismail Sabri cabinet was formed following the appointment of Ismail Sabri Yaakob as Prime Minister of Malaysia on 21 August 2021 and dissolved 15 months and 3 days later following the appointment of Anwar Ibrahim as Prime Minister on 24 November 2022. It was the 22nd cabinet of Malaysia formed since independence. Following the coalition's defeat in the 2018 general election, Barisan Nasional (BN) has formed its first cabinet. This cabinet also has the full support of Gabungan Parti Sarawak (GPS), Parti Bersatu Sabah (PBS), three independent members of the Dewan Rakyat and conditional support of the Perikatan Nasional (PN) coalition.

History 

On 1 March 2020, Parti Pribumi Bersatu Malaysia (BERSATU) withdrew from the Pakatan Harapan (PH) alliance, sparking a political crisis that resulted in Muhyiddin Yassin, the party's president, becoming the country's eighth prime minister. The continued COVID-19 pandemic was the principal concern of Muhyiddin's newly formed cabinet. The World Health Organization (WHO) has commended his government for successfully managing the outbreak's initial wave. However, in 2021, the government came under fire from the public for what was allegedly poor management of the outbreak's second and third waves.

Pertubuhan Kebangsaan Melayu Bersatu (UMNO), which had the most seats in the cabinet but did not lead the government, and BERSATU then engaged in internal conflict. On 8 July 2021, and again on 3 August, UMNO first declared that it would no longer support Muhyiddin's cabinet and government. Muhyiddin resigned as prime minister on 16 August after losing his majority.

On 20 August, King Al-Sultan Abdullah appointed Ismail Sabri Yaakob, the deputy prime minister in Muhyiddin's cabinet and vice president of UMNO, as the country's ninth prime minister. After the King was satisfied that Ismail Sabri had won the confidence of the majority in Dewan Rakyat—114 of the 220 MPs had personally come to meet the King to express their support for Ismail Sabri—the appointment was made in accordance with Articles 40(2)(a) and 43(2)(a) of the Federal Constitution. Ismail Sabri was formally sworn in before the King at Istana Negara the next evening.

Composition 
On 27 August 2021, Ismail Sabri announced his Cabinet of 31 ministers and 38 deputy ministers. The position of Deputy Prime Minister was kept vacant. Instead, the Senior Ministers will deputise for the Prime Minister in his absence should such necessity arise.

The new ministers and deputy ministers were sworn in at 2:30 pm on 30 August 2021, a day before the country's Merdeka celebration.

Deputy Minister-designate of Education II Mohamad Alamin skipped the ceremony as he was tested COVID-19 positive. Prime Minister Ismail Sabri Yaakob as well as Minister-designate of Entrepreneurship Development and Cooperative Noh Omar were also unable to attend the ceremony as they had been in close contact with a COVID-19 patient.

Ministers 
 (13) 
 (12)
 (4)
 (2)
 (1)

Deputy Ministers 
 (16)
 (13)
 (5)
 (2)
 (1)
 (1)

Appointment with a ministerial rank

Notes

References 

Government of Malaysia
Cabinets established in 2021
2021 establishments in Malaysia
Cabinets disestablished in 2022
2022 disestablishments in Malaysia